Kristen Ruhlin is an American actress. She is known for her roles in The Girl in the Park, One Life to Live, Human Giant, and She Wants Me.

Personal
Ruhlin grew up in Charleston, West Virginia and graduated from Charleston Catholic High School. She graduated from Ohio State University in 2006 with a B.S. in Fiber Properties and a minor in Theatre and Dance. She is from Charleston, West Virginia. After graduating from college she relocated to New York city in the Fall of 2006. In 2009 she moved to Los Angeles to work on a film called Missing Child, and remained there for the next few years with frequent trips back to New York, where she worked on films such as She Wants Me. Since 2013 she has been residing in New York City.

Filmography
 2013 The Road Home, with Lily Tomlin.
 2012 She Wants Me, starring as Sammy Kingston with Josh Gad, Hilary Duff, Wayne Knight and Charlie Sheen.
 2012 Stuck, with Madeline Zima.
 2010 Life-ers, TV movie from the producers of CBS and Darren Starr's We Need Girlfriends.
 2007 The Girl in the Park, with Kate Bosworth, Keri Russell and Sigourney Weaver.
 2007 Human Giant, TV show with Jonah Hill.
 2015 Missing Child

References

External links
 

Actresses from West Virginia
American film actresses
American stage actresses
Actors from Charleston, West Virginia
American television actresses
Living people
21st-century American actresses
Actresses from Ohio
Actresses from New York (state)
Ohio State University alumni
1984 births